Sellheim is a town in the locality of Breddan in the Charters Towers Region, Queensland, Australia.

Geography 

The Flinders Highway and Great Northern railway both pass through the town. Sellheim railway station serves the town.

History 
The town is named after Philip Frederic Sellheim, who was a gold warden in Charters Towers from 1880 to 1888.

Sellheim State School opened circa 1889 and closed circa 1939. It was on the corner of School Street and the Flinders Highway (approx ).

On Thursday 26 November 1902, St Mark's Anglican Church was dedicated by Archdeacon David Garland. The church cost about £200 and was opened free of debt.

On Sunday 12 August 1906, St Mary's Catholic Church was officially opened by Bishop James Duhig. In 1964, the church was relocated to Pentland, where it is still known as St Mary's.

References

External links 
 
 Photo of Day Dawn Hotel Sellheim

Towns in Queensland
Charters Towers Region
Breddan, Queensland